The Squannacook River is a  river in northern Massachusetts. It is a tributary of the Nashua River and part of the Merrimack River watershed flowing to the Atlantic Ocean.

The river rises within West Townsend, Massachusetts, at the juncture of Walker Brook, Locke Brook, and Willard Brook. Walker and Locke Brooks rise within Greenville, New Ipswich, and Mason, New Hampshire, while Willard Brook rises in Ashby, Massachusetts. The Squannacook flows east and southeast through Townsend and West Groton, Massachusetts, and joins the Nashua River in wetlands just east of Woodsville. The river is dammed three times in Townsend and twice in West Groton. It has been designated an Outstanding Resource Water.

There has been a conversion of one of the former mills on the Groton portion of the river.  The former E.H. Sampson Leather Board Mill became a senior citizen/ nursing home.  Riverside is located next to West Groton Square.

See also 
 Squannacook River Dam

References 

 Nashua River Watershed
 TopoQuest location for source of the Squannacook; U.S. Geological Survey Ashburnham, Massachusetts 7.5-minute quadrangle (1988).

Rivers of Middlesex County, Massachusetts
Tributaries of the Merrimack River
Rivers of Massachusetts
Wild and Scenic Rivers of the United States